Măcărești is a commune in Ungheni District, Moldova. It is composed of two villages, Frăsinești and Măcărești.

References

Communes of Ungheni District